Henry Augustine Tayloe (April 8, 1808 – July 15, 1903) was an American planter, slaveholder, horse breeder and racer, and land speculator in Alabama during the 19th century. 

A younger son of John Tayloe III, a wealthy planter in Washington, D.C.; Virginia; and Maryland, the young Tayloe went to Alabama in 1834, where he was among the pioneers in developing forced-labor cotton plantations in the Canebrake region, using enslaved workers. He also acted as a land agent, acquiring numerous plantations in the area for investment by his four older brothers, who were also extremely wealthy. A committed breeder and racer of horses, in 1838 he founded the Fair Grounds Race Course near New Orleans with Bernard de Marigny. He had St. Andrew's Episcopal Church (1853) built in Prairieville with enslaved labor. He later founded the town of Faunsdale, Alabama, named after a nearby plantation.

Birth, schooling and career

Tayloe was born on April 8, 1808, at The Octagon House, the youngest son of five of John Tayloe III and his wife. His father had commissioned construction of this city residence in Washington, D.C.  The boy was named in part named for his uncle, Captain William Augustine Washington, son of Augustine Washington Jr. and Anne Aylett, a nephew of George Washington. Tayloe's father had inherited the grand colonial estate Mount Airy in Richmond County, Virginia, developed by his own father Colonel John Tayloe II. These two men were, respectively, the wealthiest plantation owners in the country for their generations. Tayloe's maternal grandfather was Benjamin Ogle, ninth Governor of Maryland, and great-grandfather was former Provincial governor, Samuel Ogle.

As a youth, Tayloe asked John C. Calhoun, then Secretary of War, to support him for an appointment to West Point. Noting Tayloe was the son of a rich man, Calhoun advised him to leave such an appointment open to a boy who needed government aid in his education. Tayloe entered the University of Virginia. 

After graduating, Tayloe took on management as a planter and slaveholder at property in Maryland. He also became involved in raising thoroughbred horses for racing. His horses sometimes competed against those of President Andrew Jackson. Tayloe raced his horses himself.

Tayloe lived with his parents at The Octagon House and on his farm until 1834. He moved that year to the Canebrake region of Alabama, buying his own land and working as a land agent for his four brothers. They invested in several plantations each, in land recently ceded by the indigenous Creek people. President Jackson had been conducting Indian Removal in the Southeast since 1830, when Congress approved it. Tayloe transported many enslaved African-American workers from his family's Virginia and Maryland plantations to Alabama. As the Deep South was developed for plantations, an estimated total of one million enslaved persons were forcibly transported there, breaking up numerous families. 

Tayloe bought a number of plantations, Oakland near Uniontown, "Woodville" (now Faunsdale Plantation), Walnut Grove, Windsor, and perhaps others. Windsor was for his brother, Benjamin Ogle Tayloe, who lived in Washington. After the payments had been completed, the titles were proved defective, and the sum had to be repaid. 

At Walnut Grove Tayloe built a frame residence of eight rooms, one of the first large homes in the area. He also brought racing stock to Alabama from among his and his brothers' thoroughbred horses. A mile track was laid off near Prairieville for training uses. He entered his horses in races at the Greensboro track, Livingston, Mobile and Montgomery, Alabama; Columbus, Georgia; and New Orleans, Louisiana. His brother William Henry Tayloe, heir to Mount Airy in Virginia, sent fourteen racehorses to him at one consignment. They traveled overland. One was "Robin Hood," brother of a great Boston (horse). 

Tayloe entered his mare, "Black Maria", to race at the Metairie course, just outside New Orleans. The mare was one of four in a four-mile heat race. Black Maria and two others each won one heat of four miles (each heat was four miles). One of these three winners had to win the fourth heat in order to claim the stake. Black Maria won the deciding fourth heat, the same afternoon, thus having run a total of 16 miles. She won the sixteenth mile in 2:08 minutes. Tayloe eventually went bankrupt, but his brothers restored his fortune. He lived in comfort on his plantation, "New Hope," past his ninetieth year.

Tayloe served as Secretary of the Alabama Diocesan Episcopal Convention. He was appointed to canvass the State to build up a Bishop's Fund, at which he was successful.

Family
Tayloe married a Miss Jemison. They had five children together: four daughters, who each married, and a son who became an attorney and judge in Alabama. Daughter Anne married R. L. Maupin, a Confederate veteran and Adjutant General of the Missouri Brigade. He later served as Probate Judge of Marengo County. Virginia married a young man from New Orleans. Narcissa married a son of Alfred Hatch Place at Arcola. The youngest daughter married Mr. Shivers of Marion, Alabama. Son William H. Tayloe was elected and served as an Alabama State Senator and later as Chancellor of Alabama.

Fair Grounds Race Course

Henry A Tayloe founded the "Louisiana Race Course," now the Fair Grounds Race Course near New Orleans, with Julius C Branch and Bernard de Marigny. Tayloe's father, John Tayloe III was a leading turfman, founder of the Washington Jockey Club (1797); who imported the notable English Thoroughbred Diomed who sired Sir Archy, whose progeny include Lexington, Secretariat, and American Pharoah; grandson of John Tayloe II who imported Childers (by Flying Childers), Jenny Cameron and Jolly Rogers (three of the most important colonial imports) and who built the grand colonial estate and stud farm Mount Airy) and organized the first races in 1838. 

On April 10, 1838, the first race for "The Creole Purse" of $1,000, free only for horses bred and owned in the state of Louisiana. These were mile heats. The horses were handicapped at different weights related to their ages: two year olds a feather; three year olds 86lbs; four year olds, 100lbs; five year olds, 110lbs; six year olds, 118lbs; aged, 124lbs. An allowance of three pounds was given to mares and geldings. 

First Day, First Race - owners and horses: Fergus Duplantier, Louisianese; John F Miller, Lord of the Isles; Robert J Barrows, Tom Jones; Y.N. Oliver, Pocohantas; Sosthene Allian, Tresorrier. 
Second Race, sweepstakes for three-year-olds, weights as before, five subscribers at $1000 each, $250 forfeit, mile heats. Owners and horses: William J Minor, Britiania; Thos. J Wells, Taglioni; John F Miller, John Boy; Henry Augustine Tayloe, Tom Thurman; Col Robert Smith, Lavinia. 
Second day, first race, purse $1,200, entrance $120, free for all ages, weights as before, two mile heats. Owners and horses: Minor Kenner, Richard of York; A Barrows, Louisa Bascombe; Fergus Duplantier, Wren. 
Third day, purse $1,800, entrance $180, free for all ages, weights as before, three mile heats. Owners and horses: Wm. R Barrow, Pressure, Thos. J Wells, Dick Chin; J. S. Garrison, Pollard; John Randolph Grymes, Susan Yandall; Robert Smith, Pete Whetstone. 
Fourth day "Creole Plate" (as seen in the picture), valued at $1,000. Entrance $100, five year olds and over to carry 100lbs; four year olds and under their appropriate weights, two mile heats. Owners and horses: Adam Lewis Bingaman, Angora; Henry Augustine Tayloe, Hortense.

The second-year spring races started on March 20, 1839, and lasted for five days. "The First Day was the "Creole Purse" for $500, one mile heats; the same day the "Proprietors Purse" for $250, one mile heats; and third race "Sweepstakes" (See Spirit of Times). Second Day-"Proprietors Purse" $1,200—two mile heat; if more than two start the second best to be entitled to $200-but if two, the winner to receive $1,000. Third Day-"Jockey Club Purse" $1,800—three mile heats; of which the second best will be entitled to $300, if more than two start-if but two, the winner to receive $1500. Fourth Day-"Jockey Club Plate" value $1,500 and $500, -four mile heats-to the winner, and $500 to the second best horse, provided more than two start. Fifth Day-"Proprietors Purse" $600—mile heat-best 3 in 5; Same Day-"The Louisiana Plate" value $1,000—two mile heats; five year olds and over will carry 100lbs.- four year olds and under their appropriate weight."

St. Andrew's Episcopal Church

St. Andrew's Episcopal Church (1853), in Prairieville, Alabama, is a small Carpenter Gothic-style church built by enslaved people held by H.A. Tayloe of Gallion, Alabama. He served as Secretary of the Alabama Diocesan Episcopal Convention. The exterior of the church features wooden buttresses. It appears to have been built from a design in the book Rural Architecture, by architect Richard Upjohn.

Ancestry

References

1808 births
1903 deaths
American planters
Horse breeders
Speculators
American slave owners
Tayloe family of Virginia
Businesspeople from Washington, D.C.
People from Hale County, Alabama